Lucie Jeanne (born 13 March 1976) is a French television actress.

Biography 
Lucie Jeanne began theater at age 16 and took classes in a dancing, music and dramatic art school for four years. After obtaining her high school final exam in literature, she studied modern literature at the faculty and graduated 3 years later.

She began her career appearing in many short films and advertisements, and later in many films and series. These include Sous le Soleil where she had a recurring role in the fifth season, and Central Nuit from 2001 to 2008, in which she was part of the main cast portraying Blanche, one of the colleagues of Commandant Victor Franklin, portrayed by Michel Creton.

Filmography

References

External links 

  

1976 births
French television actresses
Actresses from Paris
Living people